BRS, Brs, or BrS may refer to:

Business
 Blue Ribbon Sports, former name of Nike, Inc.
 British Road Services, transport company
 Bruckmann, Rosser, Sherrill & Co., US private equity firm

Medicine and science
Brugada syndrome, a genetic condition
Brassia, a genus of orchids

Politics 

 Bharat Rashtra Samithi, a political party in India

Technology 
 BRS/Search, full text search engine

Transport
Berrylands railway station, London, National Rail station code
Bristol Airport, England, IATA code

Other uses
Ballistic Recovery Systems, a manufacturer of aircraft ballistic parachutes
Beijing Royal School, China
Brotherhood of Railroad Signalmen, an American labor union
Bulgarian Register of Shipping
Boston Red Sox, an American baseball team